Pixonic is a Russian video game developer and publisher based in Limassol, Cyprus. Following the company's establishment in 2009, its initial focus was on developing and publishing social network games. In 2013, Pixonic concentrated its efforts on the mobile device market. The company is best known for producing War Robots (formally known as Walking War Robots).

Company history 

Elena Masolova founded Pixonic in 2008. The firm's initial focus was on the development and publishing of games for social platforms. Despite the success of Domovyata, one of Pixonic's first social network games, the company began publishing games for mobile devices. In 2011, Pixonic received a $5 million investment as part of its "C" round, after which it launched its first mobile game – Robinson. 

In 2013, Philipp Gladkov became Pixonic's CEO. Gladkov internally restructured the firm, and turned its focus to mobile games. In the same year, Pixonic launched War Robots, which had monthly revenue of more than $1.3 million.

On 30 September 2016, Mail.ru Group (now VK) acquired 100% of the company's shares for $30 million. 

On 30 May 2019, Mail.ru has brought all its games brands (including Pixonic) under the My.Games name. 

On 6 April 2020 Pixonic launched beta-testing of their next game Dino Squad. 

On 29 September VK sold its gaming division My.Games to LETA Capital, a venture capital firm that invests in software-related startups.

References

External links 
 

Video game companies established in 2009
Mobile game companies
Video game development companies
2016 mergers and acquisitions
Video game companies of Russia